Events in the year 2015 in Kerala

Incumbents 
Governor of Kerala - P. Sathasivam

Chief minister of Kerala - Oommen Chandy

Events 

 29 January - a 47 year old security guard rammed and killed at Sobha City Thrissur using a Hummer by Mohammed Nisham owner of Kings Beedi.
 31 January - National Games inauguration at Greenfield International Stadium.
 14 February - National Gamescomes to an end with Services Sports Control Board and Kerala tops in medal tally.
 27 February - A meteoroid airburst reported in Kerala.
 March 13 - Left Democratic Front MLA's created ruckus in Kerala Legislative Assembly as part of protests against K. M. Mani during budget session.
 April 7 - Inaugural season of Malabar Premier League football kicked off at Malappuram.
 April 19 - Malayalam news channel Janam TV launched.
 April 24 - Operation Sulaimani launched at Kozhikode district.
 May 1 - Maoist couple Roopesh and P.A. Shyna were arrested by Andhra Pradesh Police from Coimbatore.
 May 2 - Operation Anantha, an Urban flood management program for Thiruvananthapuram initiated by District Disaster Management Authority.
 May 4 - Four young athletes attempts suicide at Sports Authority of India hostel in Alappuzha following harassments.
 November 2 - Kerala local elections first phase held.
 December 29 - Supreme Court of India upholds Second Chandy ministry's measures towards Prohibition, curbs on sale of alcohol etc. brought through government order in 2014 August.

Deaths 

 March 7 - G. Karthikeyan, 66, politician.

See also 

 History of Kerala
 2015 in India

References 

2010s in Kerala